The International Confederation of Electroacoustic Music (ICEM), or Bourges International Confederation of Electroacoustic Music (IMEB, also "Bourges International Institute of Electroacoustic Music"), formerly Groupe de musique expérimentale de Bourges, is a music organization in support of electroacoustic music, including computer music.

The ICEM holds the International Electronic Music Festival and gives music awards for electroacoustic music during the Bourges International Electro-Acoustic Music Competition (also known as "Bourges Electroacoustic Music Competition" and as the International Electro-Acoustic Music Competition in/at Bourges). It was founded in 1973, "to promote elecoacoustic composition," and began to include music software as a category in 1996.

Recipients
1972: Eugeniusz Rudnik, Mobile
1973: Eugeniusz Rudnik, Ostinato 3rd prize
1976: Jack Body
1981: Alejandro Viñao
1983: Jean-Baptiste Barrière, Chréode 
1984: Eugeniusz Rudnik, Homo Ludens 2nd prize
1989: Scott A. Wyatt, finalist
1999: Frank Corcoran, Sweeney's Vision
2009: Jack Body

Euphonie d'Or
Golden Sound/Sound of Gold.

1992: Alejandro Viñao
1992: Jonty Harrison, Klang
2002: Natasha Barrett, Utility of Space
2004: Jon Christopher Nelson, Scatter

Grand Prize
1984: Scott A. Wyatt

Trivium Prize
2009: Jack Body, Intimate History no. 2: ssteve

Finalists
2008: Natasha Barrett

Magisterium Prize
"The award is open to composers having at least 25 years of professional experience in the field, and its objective is 'the promotion and diffusion of works that might become milestones in the history of electroacoustic music'."

1998: Wlodzimierz Kotonski, Tierra Caliente; Jean-Claude Risset: Invisible
2007: Roger Doyle, Sectors 4 and 5 of The Ninth Set

See also
Hellenic Electroacoustic Music Composers Association
Society for Electro-Acoustic Music in the United States
Canadian Electroacoustic Community

References

External links

 

Electronic music organizations
French music awards
Music organizations based in France